A by-election was held for the New South Wales Legislative Assembly electorate of Illawarra on 10 September 1866 following the resignation of Patrick Osborne.

Dates

Candidates
John Stewart had been the unsuccessful candidate at the 1860 election, receiving 46.% of the vote, and again at the 1864 election receiving 43.3% of the vote.

Result

Patrick Osborne resigned.

See also
Electoral results for the district of Illawarra
List of New South Wales state by-elections

References

1866 elections in Australia
New South Wales state by-elections
1860s in New South Wales